David Walter Bowens (born July 3, 1977) is a former American football linebacker who played twelve seasons in the National Football League. He was drafted by the Denver Broncos in the fifth round of the 1999 NFL Draft. He played college football at Michigan.

Bowens has also been a member of the Green Bay Packers, Buffalo Bills, Washington Redskins, Miami Dolphins, New York Jets, and Cleveland Browns.

Early years
Bowens attended St. Mary's Preparatory in Orchard Lake, Michigan and was a letterman in football, basketball, and track and field.  In basketball, he won All-State honors.

College career
Bowens started his college career at the University of Michigan for two seasons before he transferred to Western Illinois.  He majored in accounting.

Professional career

Denver Broncos
Bowens was originally drafted in the fifth round (158th overall) of the 1999 NFL Draft out of Western Illinois University by the Denver Broncos.

Green Bay Packers
Bowens played for the Green Bay Packers in 2000, recording 3.5 sacks.

Miami Dolphins
Bowens played with the Miami Dolphins from 2001 to 2006.

New York Jets
On March 27, he agreed to terms on a three-year contract with the Jets worth more than $6 million. He was released by the Jets on February 19, 2009.

Cleveland Browns
Bowens was signed to a four-year, $7.2 million contract by the Cleveland Browns on March 10, 2009. The move reunited him with head coach Eric Mangini, for whom he played while with the Jets. On October 24, 2010, he caught and returned two interceptions for touchdowns against the New Orleans Saints, one for 64 yards and another for 30 yards. These were vital plays and led to the Browns upset win over the Saints, 30-17.

On February 9, 2011, the Browns released Bowens.

References

External links
 Cleveland Browns bio
 New York Jets bio

1977 births
Living people
American football defensive ends
American football linebackers
Buffalo Bills players
Cleveland Browns players
Denver Broncos players
Green Bay Packers players
Miami Dolphins players
Michigan Wolverines football players
New York Jets players
Washington Redskins players
Western Illinois Leathernecks football players
St. Mary's Preparatory alumni
Players of American football from Denver
People from Orchard Lake, Michigan
Players of American football from Michigan
Ed Block Courage Award recipients